The 2012 NCAA Division III Men's Ice Hockey Tournament was the culmination of the 2011–12 season, the 29th such tournament in NCAA history. It concluded with St. Norbert defeating Oswego State in the championship game 4-1. All First Round and Quarterfinal matchups were held at home team venues, while all succeeding games were played at the Herb Brooks Arena in Lake Placid, New York.

This tournament is notable for the fact that no team scored more than 1 goal in any losing effort.

Qualifying teams
The following teams qualified for the tournament. Automatic bids were offered to the conference tournament champion of eight different conferences. Three at-large bids were available for the highest-ranked non-conference tournament champions (overall seed in parentheses).

Format
The tournament featured four rounds of play. All rounds were Single-game elimination. The top four ranked teams received byes into the quarterfinal round  and were arranged so that were they all to reach the national semifinal, the second seed would play the third seed.

Because the top four ranked teams were all eastern teams, all four western participants were placed in the same quarterfinal bracket. The teams were arranged to that the top western seed would play the fourth western seed while the second western seed would play the third western seed all in the first round. The winners would advance to the same quarterfinal match and the winner would advance to play the winner of the eastern quarterfinal that possessed the top eastern seed.

The remaining three quarterfinal brackets were arranged as follows: the two lowest ranked eastern teams would play in the first round with the winner advancing to play the top eastern seed, the second eastern seed would play the fifth eastern seed and the third eastern seed would play the fourth eastern seed in the quarterfinals.

In the First Round and Quarterfinals the higher-seeded team served as host.

Tournament Bracket

Note: * denotes overtime period(s)

All-Tournament Team
G: David Jacobson* (St. Norbert)
D: Mike Baran (Amherst)
D: Zach McDonald (St. Norbert)
F: Ian Boots (Oswego State)
F: Cody Keefer (St. Norbert)
F: Johan Ryd (St. Norbert)
* Most Outstanding Player(s)

Record by conference

References

External links
Division III Men's Ice Hockey Record Book

 
NCAA Division III ice hockey